Nespeky is a municipality and village in Benešov District in the Central Bohemian Region of the Czech Republic. It has about 800 inhabitants. It is situated on the right bank of the Sázava River.

Administrative parts
Villages of Ledce and Městečko are administrative parts of Nespeky.

Notable people
Antonín Panenka (born 1948), footballer; lives here

References

Villages in Benešov District